Tuditanomorpha is a suborder of microsaur lepospondyls. Tuditanomorphs lived from the Late Carboniferous to the Early Permian and are known from North America and Europe. Tuditanomorphs have a similar pattern of bones in the skull roof. Tuditanomorphs display considerable variability, especially in body size, proportions, dentition, and presacral vertebral count. Currently there are seven families of tuditanomorphs, with two being monotypic. Tuditanids, gymnarthrids, and pantylids first appear in the Lower Pennsylvanian. Goniorhynchidae, Hapsidopareiontidae, Ostodolepidae, and Trihecatontidae appear in the Late Pennsylvanian and Early Permian.

Classification

Suborder Tuditanomorpha
Family Goniorhynchidae
Rhynchonkos
Family Gymnarthridae
Cardiocephalus
Elfridia
Euryodus
Leiocephalikon
Pariotichus
Sparodus 
Family Hapsidopareiontidae
Hapsidopareion
Llistrofus
Ricnodon
Saxonerpeton
Family Ostodolepidae
Micraroter
Nannaroter
Ostodolepis
Pelodosotis
Family Pantylidae
Pantylus
Trachystegos
Family Trihecatontidae
Trihecaton
Family Tuditanidae
Asaphestra
Boii
Crinodon
Tuditanus

References

External links
Tuditanomorpha in the Paleobiology Database

Taxa named by Robert L. Carroll
Microsauria